is a Japanese former long-distance runner who competed in the 1968 Summer Olympics and in the 1972 Summer Olympics.

References

1943 births
Living people
Japanese male long-distance runners
Olympic male long-distance runners
Olympic athletes of Japan
Athletes (track and field) at the 1968 Summer Olympics
Athletes (track and field) at the 1972 Summer Olympics
Asian Games gold medalists for Japan
Asian Games gold medalists in athletics (track and field)
Athletes (track and field) at the 1966 Asian Games
Medalists at the 1966 Asian Games
Universiade medalists in athletics (track and field)
Universiade gold medalists for Japan
Medalists at the 1965 Summer Universiade
Medalists at the 1967 Summer Universiade
Japan Championships in Athletics winners